Metaterol is a sympathomimetic of the phenethylamine class.

References 

Phenols
Phenylethanolamines
Sympathomimetics